Howlong  is a town  west of Albury, and is situated on the Murray River which separates the Australian states of New South Wales and Victoria. The town is located on the Riverina Highway. There is a bridge across the Murray into Victoria. Howlong is in the Federation Council local government area.

History
Prior to the founding of the township the Surveyor-General of New South Wales at that time Major Thomas Mitchell crossed the Murray River during his exploration of the area.  There is a monument to Mitchell on the Victorian side of the river which states that Mitchell and his party camped at the location on 17 October 1836 and then crossed the river slightly downstream of their camping point on the following day.

Three years later two men with a property in the area set off on the second longest cattle drive of its kind attempted in Australia at that time driving 300 head to South Australia. Also in 1838 the site of the Mitchell river crossing became the location of the first postage mail delivery by a mail carrier, John Conway Bourke when he undertook to deliver the overland mail from Sydney to what would later be called Melbourne.

The township appears to have taken its title from a property named Hoolong in the area which was owned by Isaac Rudd and was named after an Aboriginal place name meaning 'beginning of the plains'. Howlong as a township was laid out in 1854. The Post Office opened on 1 January 1861. It has frequently been noted on lists of unusual place names.

Today
Howlong is now an important inland township which services the smaller villages of the area with a range of stores that meet most of the everyday needs of the people of the area.  Nearby villages in the area include Brocklesby, Walbundrie & Chiltern

Sport

Local sporting clubs include the Howlong Football Club, an Australian rules football team, who have competed in the Hume Football League since 1953 and previously competed in the Chiltern & District Football Association in 1915 & 1916 and 1923 to 1952. The Howlong Football Club played in the Ovens and Murray Football League from 1911 to 1914 and again in 1919. 

The Howlong Golf Resort which is the biggest membership Club in Australia and won the Jack Newton Junior Golf Club Of The Year 2011, the 2012 Golf Australia Centre Of The Year, the 2014 Highly Commended Winners from Clubs NSW, the 2015 Community Awards Finalist from Clubs NSW and hosts the renowned Top of the Murray and Murray Masters Tournaments.

The town is immortalised in the song "By the time I get to Howlong" from Spiderbait's album Grand Slam.

Gallery

References

External links
Howlong Football & Netball Club

Towns in the Riverina
Towns in New South Wales
Populated places on the Murray River
Federation Council, New South Wales